Asha Djafari (born 10 July 1998) is a Burundian footballer who plays as a midfielder for Tanzanian Women's Premier League club Simba Queens and the Burundi women's national team.

References

External links 
 

1998 births
Living people
Burundian women's footballers
Women's association football midfielders
Simba S.C. players
Burundi women's international footballers
Burundian expatriate footballers
Burundian expatriate sportspeople in Tanzania
Expatriate women's footballers in Tanzania